Sam Craigie (born 29 December 1993) is an English professional snooker player from Newcastle. He enjoyed a successful junior career before turning professional in 2011.

Career

Early career
Craigie qualified for the 2011/2012 Main Tour after winning the 2010 IBSF World Under 21 Championships. He defeated his brother Stephen 7–6 in the semi-finals before beating Li Hang 9–8 in the final to secure the title.

2011/2012 season
In his debut season on the snooker tour he was unranked and therefore needed to win four qualifying matches to make the main draws of the ranking events. He won two matches in attempts to reach both the Australian Goldfields Open and German Masters respectively and had his best set of results in qualifying for the China Open, where he beat Adam Wicheard, Liu Song and Gerard Greene, before losing to Ricky Walden 3–5 in the final round. Craigie played in 11 of the 12 minor-ranking Players Tour Championship events throughout the season, with his best finish coming in Event 11 where he was defeated by Walden again, this time in the last 16 by 4 frames to 2. Craigie finished his first season ranked outside of the top 64 who automatically retained their places for the 2012/2013 season and therefore dropped off the main tour.

Following years
Craigie played in two events in the 2012/2013 season, but could only pick up one frame. He did not enter an event in the following season, but did play in 2015 Q School, coming closest to rejoining the tour in the first event when he was defeated 4–2 by Adam Duffy in the last 32.

2016/2017 season
In 2016, Craigie received a two-year tour card for the 2016/2017 and 2017/2018 seasons after successfully qualifying through the EBSA Play-Offs in Sheffield, beating Adam Duffy 4–3 in the last round of the event. He qualified for the World Open with a 5–3 victory over 1997 world champion Ken Doherty and won his first match in a main draw of a ranking event by beating Marco Fu 5–3 in the opening round. Craigie was then edged out 5–4 by Matthew Selt. Craigie made a century and two fifty plus breaks to whitewash Jamie Jones 4–0 at the Northern Ireland Open, before John Higgins made a 147, 137 and 130 in a second round 4–1 defeat.
Craigie was 3–1 ahead of Mark King at the interval of their first round match at the UK Championship and that quickly became 4–1 when King was docked a frame for forgetting his cue at the resumption of play. Craigie went on to win 6–2, but in the second round lost 6–5 to Luca Brecel after leading 5–3.
Shaun Murphy knocked Craigie out of the Shoot-Out and in the second round of the Gibraltar Open.

He dropped off the tour at the end of the 2017/18 season but entered Q School in an attempt to win back a place. He defeated former crucible semi-finalist Andy Hicks in round 3 of the first event. He defeated Dechawat Poomjaeng in the final round to secure his return to the tour at the first event.

2018/2019 season 
Craigie regained his two-year tour card after qualifying through Q School. In April 2019, he reached the quarter final of a ranking event for the first time at the China Open after beating the likes of Ryan Day, Ali Carter and Liang Wenbo before being whitewashed by Neil Robertson.

2019/2020 season 
Craigie's best result for the season was reaching the Last 32 of the Riga Masters after beating Long Zehuang and Jamie O'Neil before losing 4–3 to Matthew Selt.

2020/2021 season 
Craigie qualified for the World Snooker Championship for the first time after beating Ashley Hugill, Hossein Vafaei, and Zhao Xintong in the qualifying rounds. He drew Mark Williams in the first round.

Personal life
Craigie's elder brother Stephen was also a professional snooker player.

Performance and rankings timeline

Career finals

Amateur finals: 1 (1 title)

References

External links

Sam Craigie at worldsnooker.com

English snooker players
Living people
1993 births
Sportspeople from Newcastle upon Tyne